Sujita Basnet (born 10 May 1993) is an American-born Nepali beauty pageant, social worker and management consultant who was crowned as Miss Universe Nepal 2021. She represented Nepal at Miss Universe 2021. She worked at many social organisations in the USA and became a well-known social worker. She has participated in many beauty pageants from 2011 to 2021. She was also the first runner up to Miss Universe Nepal 2020.

Early life
Sujita Basnet was born in Maryland to single mother Reena Karki and raised in Kathmandu, Nepal by her grandparents until the age of 5 while her mother was completing her studies in the United States. Sujita completed her education at North Point High School in Bennsville, Maryland. After her high school education in Maryland, she moved to Washington D.C., to attend George Washington University. She graduated with a bachelor's degree in Biomedical / Medical Engineering.

Career

From January 2013 to April 2013, Sujita was a congressional intern in the office of U.S. representative Ami Bera at the United States Capitol, in Washington D.C. From May 2013 to September 2013, she served as a 2013 Peace Fellow in Dang, Nepal. From January 2014 to January 2015, she was an undergraduate research assistant at the Center for Neuroscience Research in Washington D.C. In May 2015, she joined Privatin Consulting in Baltimore, Maryland as a business analyst. In May 2016, she was promoted to the senior business analyst at Privatin Consulting. She was promoted to management consultant in May 2017, and later to senior lead consultant of Privatin Consulting in May 2018. She officially left the Privatin Consulting in February 2019 and she joined Accenture Federal Services as a management consultant in April 2019.

In November 2016, she founded the Liberated Scholarship Program, to support young Nepali women from lower castes, through tertiary level education, leadership training and full-time job placement support.

Pageantry
On the 20th of August 2011, Sujita entered the very first Miss Nepal USA pageant at age 18. She won the competition and was awarded the title of Miss Best Catwalk during the coronation night held at the Sheraton Hotel in Flushing, New York. She competed again in 2016 Miss Maryland World where she was one of the winners of the pageant. She represented Maryland in Miss World America 2016 where she came in the top-12 semifinalists with extra achievements of Top-5 in both Beach Beauty and Top Model. She participated again in Miss Maryland World 2019 where she ended up as 1st runner up in the pageant. On November 11, 2019, she participated in Miss Maryland USA 2019 where she came 2nd runner up in the pageant and also won the People's Choice Award. On December 30, 2020, she competed in Miss Universe Nepal 2020 where she ended up as 1st runner-up. She also won the title of Miss Lifestyle. She participated again in Miss Universe Nepal 2021 where she won in her final year of pageant eligibility, and she won the titles of Miss Fabulous and Miss Fierce during the pageant. 

In an interview she said that she participated again to achieve her dreams as Miss Universe Nepal, she says that what sets her apart from the past Miss Universe Nepal winners is that she is very resilient, and she never gives up. She had an amazing journey last time in 2020 and she is ready to achieve her dreams. Her social advocacy is BASE (Backward Education Society) which is about educating the underprivileged children of Nepal where she said, "I feel privileged to have had this opportunity to give a voice for justice to those children who have dismissed the idea of a better life". She represented Nepal at Miss Universe 2021 in Eilat, Israel.

Pageants trivia

References

External links
Miss Nepal Website
Miss Universe Nepal Website

Living people
1993 births
Miss Nepal winners
Nepalese beauty pageant winners
Miss Universe 2021 contestants
People from Maryland
American people of Nepalese descent
George Washington University alumni